Georgeta Cojocaru (born 11 March 1975) is a Romanian table tennis player. She competed in the women's doubles event at the 1996 Summer Olympics.

References

1975 births
Living people
Romanian female table tennis players
Olympic table tennis players of Romania
Table tennis players at the 1996 Summer Olympics
Sportspeople from Slatina, Romania